The A19 is a major road in England running approximately parallel to and east of the A1 road. Although the two roads meet at the northern end of the A19, the two roads originally met at the southern end of the A19 in Doncaster, but the old route of the A1 was changed to the A638. From Sunderland northwards, the route was formerly the A108. In the past the route was known as the East of Snaith-York-Thirsk-Stockton-on-Tees-Sunderland Trunk Road. Most traffic joins the A19, heading for Teesside, from the A168 at Dishforth Interchange.

Route

Doncaster–Selby 
The southern end of the A19 starts at the St Mary's Roundabout with the A630 Church Way and A638 just to the north of Doncaster itself near to the parish church; this junction has been improved in recent years. It leaves the A638 at the next roundabout as Bentley Road, and then winds its way over the East Coast Main Line, which it follows through Selby and York, through the suburb of Bentley passing the Shell Bentley Service Station, St Peter's church and the Druid's Arms and out into the countryside to the north of the urban area. It then passes the Pavilion exhibition centre.

Much of the course of the southern section of the A19 runs through the old Yorkshire coalfield, with evidence of old slag-heaps and colliery buildings. It passes through Toll Bar and the primary school. It passes through Askern, a former mining village. It meets the B1220 for Carcroft and goes through Owston, passing the Owston Park Lodge. Here it passes the Askern Hotel, Red Lion Hotel and Askern Service Station and goes over a level crossing. There is also a boating lake, St Peter's church and a greyhound stadium. There is a left turn for Norton. There are some long straights north of here, and the surrounds are mostly flat as the road heads towards the M62. It enters North Yorkshire and the district of Selby where it crosses the River Went near Walden Stubbs. There are some crossroads at Balne Moor, and it passes through Whitley Thorpe and Whitley and the George & Dragon. It meets the M62 at junction 34.

From the M62, the village of Eggborough has been bypassed in recent years, with the new road travelling from this roundabout to near the site of the power station to the right (there were three power stations in a row at this point, running west–east: Ferrybridge, Eggborough, and Drax, with its enormous chimney, to the east, though Ferrybridge and Eggborough have been demolished). Close by is Whitley Bridge and the A19 then meets the A645 at a roundabout and its previous alignment to the north of the village, before travelling through Chapel Haddlesey where it crosses the River Aire and the small village of Burn, west of the former RAF Burn, where it crosses the Selby Canal, then before Brayton, it joins the A63. The £44 million six-mile A63 Selby bypass, to the south of the town opened on 11 June 2004. Before this happened, all the traffic, headed straight towards the centre of Selby, over a level-crossing and on to a busy traffic-light junction with the A63 from Leeds. The A19 took the major of the shared road through the town centre, whilst crossing the old Selby toll bridge and heading on north towards York. The road is still the A19 through Selby, but the bypass is the A63. However, north-bound traffic follows the A63.

Selby–Thirsk 

The £5 million  Riccall and Barlby bypass opened in October 1987. This improved junctions with the A63 (Howden) and A163 (Holme-on-Spalding-Moor). The A63 and A19 meet at a roundabout near a large pickle factory. It heads towards Riccall where the road is much straighter after the bypass; it is following what was the East Coast Main Line before the Selby Diversion was built. Where the road leaves the old railway, the Trans Pennine Trail follows along the old track. At Escrick, it enters the Vale of York, and passes the BP York Road Garage, the Parsonage Hotel and the church of St Helen. Next is Deighton, passing the White Swan Inn, then it heads towards Crockey Hill. It meets the A64 near the headquarters of Persimmon plc.

The York Northern By-Pass as the A1237 is a substitute for the A19 through York – this road is poorly engineered and has frequent roundabouts. The A19 still goes through York, beginning with the Fulford Interchange with the A64 close to a shopping centre, then Fulford, meeting the B1222 and passing St Oswald's church. It crosses the East Coast Main Line and passes through Clifton and Rawcliffe. North of York, the road passes the Riverside Farm pub, then goes through Skelton as Shipton Road passing the Blacksmith's Arms and Ramada York Hotel. It re-enters North Yorkshire and the district of Hambleton and goes straight through the middle of Shipton by Beningbrough as Main Street. It passes the Sidings Hotel, Dawnay Arms and the Holy Evangelists church. Leaving the village it passes a garage on the left; on 25 July 2004 Mark Hobson was caught by the police here.

There is a left turn for Tollerton and goes through Tollerton Forest. Heading northward the section between York and Thirsk was not helped much by the opening of the £5 million  Easingwold Bypass in November 1994, as the road remained single carriageway, starting at a roundabout. There is a left turn for Raskelf. Here it passes the Black Bull pub. There is the small dwelling of Birdforth with a roadside cafe and crossroads for Hutton Sessay and Carlton Husthwaite. It crosses the Thirkleby Beck near Great Thirkleby. It meets the A168 from the south, and the old route through Thirsk is now the A170 then the A61. The bypass meets the A61 and A168 (for Northallerton) at a junction near South Kilvington.

Thirsk–Billingham 

North of Thirsk, the A19 takes over from the A168 as the link from the A1 to Teesside and becomes a fast dual carriageway with mostly grade separated interchanges. The five-mile £4.4 million Thirsk bypass was opened on 5 September 1972 by Robin Turton, Baron Tranmire, the local MP (from 1929), with a flypast by four Royal Air Force Vickers Varsity aircraft – RAF Topcliffe is to the south-west of Thirsk. It passes North Kilvington, and the £0.3 million South of Knayton (at Swan Lane) to north of Thirsk bypass section opened in the early 1970s. It climbs slightly past the junction at Knayton near Borrowby and skirting the western edge of the North York Moors, meeting the A684 (for Northallerton) at Clack Lane End after passing through Leake and by the Haynes Arms. The Borrowby diversion opened in the late 1960s. The £1.1 million south of Clack Lane End to north end of Borrowby diversion opened in the early 1970s. The Cleveland Tontine to Clack Lane End improvement opened in the early 1970s. It drops towards the Cleveland Tontine at the junction with the A172 (for Stokesley and Guisborough).  later, it passes the BP Exelby Services on both sides of the road. Eventually after passing the Crathorne/Yarm exit the road passes over the Leven viaduct towards Teesside. From the Crathorne bypass, the road leaves the old route to the east, with the old route now being the A67 then the A135 through Stockton. About  from the Parkway Turn (A174) in Middlesbrough the road is raised slightly, overlooking Thornaby industrial estate and the town of Ingleby Barwick, giving clues that Teesside is imminent.

At the Parkway the lighting columns appear then the road widens to three lanes, then at Acklam at the A1130 interchange it becomes four before two peel off for the A66 for Stockton-on-Tees and Middlesbrough. The Tees Bridge opened in 1975. Either side of the River Tees crossing, the Tees Viaduct, is a retail park – Teesside Park with a Morrisons to the south of the river and Portrack with an Asda on the Stockton side, with a mass of industry in the vicinity of the A66/A19 interchange. This interchange is one of the few 4-way free-flow interchanges in Britain not found on the motorway network, and is similar to a four-level stack interchange, but with a single loop ramp covering the A19 south to A66 west movement.  This road was improved in 1998 by widening from 2 to 3 & 4 lanes each way the  section between the Parkway and Norton. Even in rush hour the road still flows quite well. The grade-separated  £19 million Billingham Diversion was officially opened in February 1983, which diverted the traffic through a sub-standard section with roundabouts (Wolviston By-pass) built in the late 1960s.

Billingham–Seaton Burn 

Past Teesside the A19 enters rural landscape, meeting the former route through Billingham, where it enters the borough of Hartlepool. There is a right turn for Dalton Piercy at the Windmill Motel, and two link roads into Elwick, to the east. At Sheraton with Hulam, there is an intersection for the B1280 (for Wingate to the west), and the A179 (for Hartlepool, to the east). At this intersection the road enters County Durham. The route over Sedgewick Hill has been improved to the east. There is staggered crossroads, for Hutton Henry, to the left. There used to be a right turn for Castle Eden, now accessible only from the southbound carriageway. North of here, the Castle Eden Diversion opened in the early 1970s. It crosses a former railway (now NCN 1 and 14), and meets the A181 (for Wheatley Hill and Durham), and the B1281 (for Hesleden) at an intersection, and passes west of Shotton, where it joins the former route. There is a large intersection at Burnhope Way Roundabout for Shotton Colliery and a large industrial estate, to the west, and the B1320 for the new town of Peterlee, to the east.
A flyover was constructed in the early 1990s to replace the previous roundabout, known locally as the Turnpike.

The 3.5-mile Easington and Cold Hesledon Diversion opened in the early 1970s, initially designated as the A19(M). There is an access road to the south from Easington and the A1086 (for Peterlee and Hartlepool) has limited access to the northbound and from the southbound routes. There is an intersection for the A182 (for Hetton-le-Hole), and limited access from the B1283 (for Easington Village), with no access from the southbound route. The former route north of Easington is the B1432 (to the east). At Cold Hesledon, there is an intersection for the A182 (to Seaham, to the east) and the B1285 (for Murton, to the west). The three-mile New Seaham and Seaton Diversion opened in the early 1970s, with the former route now the B1285 through Dalton-le-Dale. The eight miles of sections from Easington to Seaham were built by A. R. Carmichael in late 1971, and made the A19 from Thirsk to Sunderland completely dual-carriageway, with the contract awarded in October 1969. At Seaton with Slingley, there is a limited-access (to and from the south) intersection for the A1018, for Sunderland and Ryhope. At the same point there is a limited-access intersection (to and from the north) for the B1404 for Seaton and Houghton-le-Spring. The former route through the south of Sunderland is now the B1522. At the point where a former railway crosses (now NCN Route 1) the road enters the City of Sunderland.

At this point, the A19 makes a large deviation from its former route, by bypassing Sunderland from the west. Its former route went near the coast. The 8.75-mile Sunderland Bypass opened as the A108, and was built by W.C. French, with fourteen bridges and five underpasses, with the contract awarded in February 1970. The A108 was also previously the number of an A road in north London, for a re-routed A10 to Hoddesdon. At Herrington the A19 meets the A690 (for Houghton-le-Spring) and the B1286 at an interchange. It is crossed by the B1286. At Offerton and Hastings Hill there is an interchange with the A183 road (for Penshaw and Pennywell). The road crosses the River Wear on the Hylton Bridge, which was built as the A108 in 1975 by W.C. French (Construction) Ltd. At North Hylton, there is an interchange with the A1231 (for Washington and Castletown). It passes the Sunderland Nissan plant on the left, formerly the site of the Battle of Britain airfield, RAF Usworth. It meets the A1290, for Washington, at an interchange, where the road enters the borough of South Tyneside and is crossed by the Great North Forest Trail.

At Testo's Roundabout with the A184 (for Gateshead and The Boldons), the A19 originally ended as the A1 took over to run through the Tyne Tunnel, before that classification became assigned to the Newcastle Western Bypass from the Angel of the North to Kingston Park. To the east the A19 now approaches the Tyne Tunnel, where a second tunnel opened in 2011 to relieve traffic congestion. There is a limited access junction (from the north) for Hedworth, and the road is crossed by the Green Line of the Tyne and Wear Metro. It meets the A194 (for South Shields) at an interchange. At the Jarrow Interchange, there is a roundabout for the A185 (for Hebburn) and the B1297 at the start of the single-carriageway £13 million Tyne Tunnel, opened in October 1967 as the A108. The former route north of Sunderland is now the A1018.

The A19 continues in a north-westerly direction through North Tyneside past Killingworth and Cramlington, rejoining the current A1, just north of Newcastle at Seaton Burn.

Between Testo's Roundabout and Seaton Burn, the A19 was designated as part of the A1 until the opening of the Newcastle Western Bypass.

Incidents 
In November 1986 a tanker loaded with toluene overturned and caught fire near Brookfield. The driver and the occupants of three cars were injured. The fire burned for eight hours and led to residents being warned by Cleveland Police of potentially toxic fumes. The fire service later criticised the police response as a "massive overreaction".

In June 2008 a fuel tanker began leaking oil from its engine covering a mile-long stetch, including bend, before stopping near Hartlepool. A small fire broke out and cars began sliding, although none crashed. The fire service shut down the road to clean it.

In popular culture 
The road also inspired the song "A19" by the North East band Maxïmo Park.

References

External links 

 Selby bypass opens June 2004.
 Problems with the Selby bypass.
 New Tyne crossing on CBRD.
 Village bypass delay anger
 Villagers in fresh push for bypass
 Multiple murderer Mark Hobson is caught at a petrol station on A19 at Shipton by Beningbrough.
 SABRE article on the A19
 SABRE article on the A108
 Highway Agency DFBO Dishforth to Tyne Tunnel

Transport in Tyne and Wear
Transport in North Yorkshire
Roads in Doncaster
Roads in England
Transport in the City of Sunderland
Transport in York
Teesside
Borough of Hartlepool
Roads in Tyne and Wear
Roads in South Shields